The list of museums in Texas encompasses museums defined for this context as institutions (including nonprofit organizations, government entities, and private businesses) that collect and care for objects of cultural, artistic, scientific, or historical interest and make their collections or related exhibits available for public viewing. Also included are non-profit art galleries and exhibit spaces. Closed museums and museums that exist only in cyberspace (i.e., virtual museums) are not included.

Central Texas
  
Central Texas  is a region in the U.S. state of Texas. It is roughly bordered by Greater San Antonio to the Texas Hill Country to McLennan County to Washington County.

Counties included are Bandera, Bastrop, Bell, Bexar, Blanco, Bosque, Brazos, Burleson, Burnet, Caldwell, Comal, Comanche, Coryell, Falls, Fayette, Freestone, Gillespie, Grimes, Hamilton, Hays, Hill, Kendall, Kerr, Kimble, Lampasas, Lee, Leon, Limestone, Llano, Madison, Mason, McLennan, Milam, Mills, Robertson, San Saba, Travis, Washington, Williamson, and Wilson County, Texas.

Museums in Central Texas, listed by county

Bandera - Bell

Bexar

Blanco  - Burnet

Caldwell - Coryell

Falls - Freestone

Gillespie - Grimes

Hamilton - Hill

Kendall - Kimble

Lampasas - LLano

Madison - Mills

Robertson - San Saba

Travis County

Washington - Wilson

Defunct museums
 Central Texas Museum of Automotive History, Rosanky, closed in 2012, collections moved to Dick's Classic Garage in San Marcos, Texas
 Dog Museum, Waco, private collection of dog memorabilia located in Antiquibles Antique Mall, reported closed in 2014
 Fort Graham Museum
 Goodwill Computer Museum, Austin, closed in 2015
 Hertzberg Circus Collection and Museum, San Antonio, closed in 2001, collections now at the Witte Museum
 Henkel Square Museum Village, Round Top, authentic restoration of Anglo-American and German-American 19th century homes, now the Henkel Square Market shopping village since 2010
 Hill Country Wildlife Museum, LLano 
 Katherine Anne Porter House, Kyle, no longer a museum but now the Katherine Anne Porter Literary Center
Museo Alameda, San Antonio, closed in 2012, space now the Educational & Cultural Arts Center for Texas A & M San Antonio
 Museum of Aerospace Medicine, San Antonio, closed in 2011 
 USAF Security Forces Museum, San Antonio, history of the U.S. Air Force Security Forces, closed in 2014 and being consolidated with the USAF Airman Heritage Museum
 Texas Pioneers, Trail Drivers, Rangers Memorial Museum, San Antonio, moved to the Texas Ranger Museum at the Buckhorn Saloon & Museum,
Texas Museum of Science and Technology - closed in 2020 
Palm House Museum, Austin - closed 2021
|-

See also

 List of museums in Texas
 List of museums in East Texas
 List of museums in the Texas Gulf Coast
 List of museums in North Texas
 List of museums in the Texas Panhandle
 List of museums in South Texas
 List of museums in West Texas

Resources
Texas Association of Museums
Historic House Museums in Texas

References

Lists of museums in Texas